Erwin is an unincorporated community in Black Township, Posey County, in the U.S. state of Indiana.

History
The community was named for David M. Erwin, a local merchant.

Geography

References

Unincorporated communities in Posey County, Indiana
Unincorporated communities in Indiana